David Zinman (born July 9, 1936, in Brooklyn, NY) is an American conductor and violinist.

Education
After violin studies at Oberlin Conservatory, Zinman studied theory and composition at the University of Minnesota, earning his M.A. in 1963. He took up conducting at Tanglewood and from 1958 to 1962 worked in Maine with Pierre Monteux; he served as Monteux's assistant from 1961 to 1964.

Career in the Netherlands
Zinman held the post of tweede dirigent (second conductor) of the Netherlands Chamber Orchestra from 1965 to 1977 and was principal conductor of the Rotterdam Philharmonic Orchestra from 1979 to 1982.

Career

In the United States
Zinman served as music director of the Rochester Philharmonic Orchestra from 1974 to 1985, during the last two years of which tenure he also was principal guest conductor of the Baltimore Symphony Orchestra. He became music director in Baltimore in 1985. There he made several recordings for Telarc and Argo and Sony, toured widely, and began to implement ideas from the historically-informed-performance movement in interpretations of the Beethoven symphonies. Upon relinquishing that Baltimore post in 1998, Zinman was named the orchestra's conductor laureate. But he renounced this title three years later in protest at what he saw as the orchestra's increasingly conservative programming.

U.S. festivals
In 1998 Zinman worked as music director of the Ojai Music Festival alongside pianist Mitsuko Uchida. That same year he was appointed music director of the Aspen Music Festival and School, where he founded and directed its American Academy of Conducting until his sudden resignation in April 2010.

Tenure in Switzerland
Zinman became music director of the Tonhalle-Orchester Zürich in 1995. His innovative programming with that orchestra includes a series of late-night concerts, "Tonhalle Late", which combine classical music and a nightclub setting.  His recordings for Arte Nova of the complete Beethoven symphonies were based on the new Jonathan Del Mar critical edition and was acclaimed by critics.  He has subsequently recorded Beethoven overtures and concertos with the Tonhalle.  He conducted the Tonhalle Orchestra in its first-ever appearance at The Proms in 2003.  He concluded his Tonhalle music directorship on July 21, 2014 with a concert at The Proms.

Filmscores 

Zinman conducted the soundtrack of the 1993 film of the New York City Ballet production of Tchaikovsky's Nutcracker. In 2009 he led the Tonhalle-Orchester Zürich in the filmscore 180°: If Your World Is Suddenly Upside-Down, composed by the sibling trio Diego Baldenweg with Nora Baldenweg and Lionel Baldenweg; this won the Suisa prize for "Best Original Score" at the Locarno Film Festival in 2010.

Awards
In 2006 he received the Theodore Thomas Award presented by the Conductors' Guild.

Best-selling recording
Zinman's 1992 recording of Henryk Górecki’s Symphony no.3 with Dawn Upshaw and the London Sinfonietta was an international bestseller.

Personal life
Zinman and his second wife, Mary, an Australian violist, live in New Jersey. Zinman has two sons and a daughter.

References

External links
 David Zinman official website
 David Zinman official Blog
 David Zinman at Art of the States
 
 David Zinman at Sony Classical
 
 
 Interview with David Zinman, February 11, 2000

Selected Discography

Elgar- Enigma Variations/Cockaigne Overture (Baltimore Symphony Orchestra) Telarc 1989

1936 births
American male conductors (music)
Aspen Music Festival and School faculty
20th-century American conductors (music)
21st-century American conductors (music)
Fiorello H. LaGuardia High School alumni
Living people
Oberlin College alumni
University of Minnesota College of Liberal Arts alumni
Grammy Award winners
Educators from New York City
20th-century American male musicians
21st-century American male musicians